Ozren Grabarić (born 17 July 1980) is a Croatian actor.

Filmography

Film

Television

Voice-over roles

References

External links
 

1980 births
20th-century Croatian actors
21st-century Croatian actors
Academy of Dramatic Art, University of Zagreb alumni
Croatian Theatre Award winners
Croatian baritones
Croatian comedians
Croatian male film actors
Croatian male stage actors
Croatian male television actors
Croatian male voice actors
Croatian theatre directors
Living people
Male Shakespearean actors
Male actors from Zagreb
Academic staff of the University of Zagreb